Delitti e profumi (also known as Crimes and Perfume) is a 1988 Italian giallo film directed by Vittorio De Sisti, based on a story entitled Scarlet by Bonadies and De Fornari, both of whom also worked on the screenplay.
Traci Lords appears in a cameo, a brief appearance in a softcore porn clip.

Cast
 Jerry Calà as Eddy
 Umberto Smaila as  Inspector Turroni
 Lucrezia Lante della Rovere as  Barbara
 Eva Grimaldi as  Porzia
 Mara Venier as  Sister Melania
 Marina Viro as Maria Rita aka "Mariri"
 Simonetta Gianfelici as   Ambra
 Nina Soldano as  Yoko 
 Silvia Annichiarico as The Department Director
 Novello Novelli as The Ventriloquist
 Alba Parietti as  Patty Pravo
 Traci Lords in cameo appearance

Plot
Eddy, a detective who works as a security guard in a department store, is engaged to Barbara, a clerk in the same store. After receiving some perfume as a gift from a mysterious admirer, Barbara is burnt to death when she walks under some warm halogen spotlights. In order to discover what killed Barbara, Eddy decides to investigate together with Inspector Turroni. Afterwards, a prostitute named Portia is murdered in a similar way and Eddy discovers the cause of their deaths... the perfume sent to each victim by the killer contains a highly flammable substance (benzopyrene-15). Eddy decides to find if there was a connection between the two victims and he discovers that each victim had in her possession a piece of a picture. The picture was taken years before, in 1971,  when the victims were just young girls. They had spent that summer together with a girl named Mariri, and one other mysterious girl, at a holiday camp managed by Sister Melania. The criminal is apparently getting revenge for a terrible accident that happened that summer at the camp.

References

External links
 
 Delitti e profumi at Variety Distribution

1988 films
Giallo films
1980s Italian-language films
1980s crime thriller films
Films directed by Vittorio De Sisti
1980s Italian films
Italian crime thriller films